The City municipality of Vranjska Banja is a town and one of two city municipalities which constitute the City of Vranje. It is also one of the spa resorts in Serbia. A restaurant by the old clinic is situated at the end of the town.

The municipality has a population of 9,580 inhabitants, while the urban area has 5,347 inhabitants.

History
There are many excavations of early Byzantine fortresses in the region, all abandoned in the 6th and 7th century when the Slavs permanently settled in the area.

Demographics

Spa
The Vranjska Banja resort thermal spring, with discharge temperatures of 96°C (205°F), are the hottest geothermal spring in Serbia. The spa water contains high levels of hydrogen sulfide (H2S), and has positive effects on illnesses related to rheumatism, skin conditions, neurological problems and others. Vranjska Banja offers short tours to nearby cities like Vranje, Vladičin Han, Surdulica and the Vlasina Lake. It is situated close to the main railroad, connecting Belgrade and Athens.

See also
 List of spa towns in Serbia

References

Further reading
Спасић, Н. "Врањска Бања." (2005).

External links

 Info – portal grada Vranja

Populated places in Pčinja District
Municipalities of Vranje
Spa towns in Serbia